Anna Telugu Desam Party (ATDP) was a regional political party in the Indian state of Andhra Pradesh. ATDP was founded on January 27, 1999, by Nandamuri Harikrishna, the third son of the Telugu Desam Party founder N.T. Rama Rao. N. Harikrishna held a revolt against the TDP leader N. Chandrababu Naidu.

On January 28, 1999 Rajya Sabha MP Daggubati Venkateswara Rao left the Bharatiya Janata Party and joined ATDP. Another Rajya Sabha MP, Yarlagadda Lakshmi Prasad, also joined the party, giving ATDP two seats in the upper house of the Parliament of India. ATDP held a single seat in the Legislative Assembly of Andhra Pradesh, represented by S. Madhusudhana Chary (previously belonging to the NTR-TDP).

ATDP worked hard ahead of the 1999 Andhra Pradesh assembly elections. An electoral alliance was set up with Communist Party of India and Communist Party of India (Marxist) (who both had been TDP allies). A controversy surged within the alliance, due to ATDP line of wanting to ban foreign-born Sonia Gandhi from becoming Prime Minister. The left found that position unacceptable. In total ATDP launched 191 candidates, but the result was a complete flop. The party got 371,718 votes (1.12% of the votes in the state), but could not win a single seat.

In the Lok Sabha elections the same year the party launched 20 candidates, and received 244,045 votes (0.73% of the votes in the state), but no seats were won.

References

Defunct political parties in Andhra Pradesh
Political parties established in 1999
1999 establishments in Andhra Pradesh
Political parties with year of disestablishment missing